Blackhawk Farms is a  private circuit racetrack located outside South Beloit, Illinois, on a  farm on the border between Wisconsin and Illinois. Blackhawk Farms was established in 1967, about a decade after nearby Road America.

History
Blackhawk Farms was designed by Jerry Dunbar and built in 1967 by Tito and Marcia Nappi. The Nappis owned and operated the track until its sale in 1986 to Mike and Raymond Irwin. The track was maintained and operated by the Irwins until its sale in August 2007 to Paul Musschoot, a local businessman and longtime SCCA racer and technical inspector. In 2008, many improvements were made to the track site including a brand new tech building and Kohler sponsored bathroom facility.  Additional improvements included reducing the property's water table with added drainage and an onsite Frisby Performance tire dealer. 

The track currently hosts events for the Midwestern Council, SCCA, VSCDA, and SVRA, ASRA-CCS. The Mid-American Racing Series was added to the schedule in 2021.

References

External links
Blackhawk Farms Website

Motorsport venues in Illinois
Buildings and structures in Winnebago County, Illinois
Tourist attractions in Winnebago County, Illinois

Road courses in the United States